Fujientomon is a genus of hexapods in the order Protura, placed in its own family, Fujientomidae. It contains two species found in China and Japan.

Fujientomon  was originally described by Imadaté in 1964, and was redescribed by Nakamura in 2014.

Species
 Fujientomon dicestum Yin, 1977
 Fujientomon primum Imadaté, 1964

References

Protura